AO-46 may refer to:

 USS Victoria (AO-46)
 AO-46 compact assault rifle